Cycas sancti-lasallei is a recently described species of cycad endemic to Mindanao, Philippines. It is found in the Cugman River watershed in Cagayan de Oro, Misamis Oriental, Philippines.

References

Agoo, E.M.G.; Madulid, D.A. 2012. Cycas sancti-lasallei (Cycadaceae), a New Species from the Philippines. Blumea - Biodiversity, Evolution and Biogeography of Plants. 57(2); 131–133. DOI: https://dx.doi.org/10.3767/000651912X657503

sancti-lasallei
Plants described in 2012